Pepsiman may refer to:

 Pepsiman, a mascot character for carbonated soft drink manufacturer Pepsi
 Pepsiman (video game), an action game developed and published by KID for the PlayStation